Maria Winifred Carney (4 December 1887 – 21 November 1943), also known as Winnie Carney, was an Irish suffragist, trade unionist, and Irish independence activist.

Early life 

Born into a lower-middle class Catholic family at Fisher's Hill in Bangor, County Down, Carney was the daughter of commercial traveler Alfred Carney and Sarah Cassidy who had married in Belfast on 25 February 1873. She had six siblings.

Winifred and her family moved to Falls Road in Belfast when she was a child, where her mother ran a small sweet shop. Her father, a Protestant, later left the family, leaving her mother to support them. Carney was educated at the Christian Brothers School in Donegall Street in the city, later teaching at the school. She enrolled at Hughes Commercial Academy around 1910, where she qualified as a secretary and shorthand typist, one of the first women in Belfast to do so. However, from the start she was looking towards doing more than just secretarial work.

Early career
In 1912 Carney was in charge of the women's section of the Irish Textile Workers' Union in Belfast, which she founded with Delia Larkin in 1912. During this period she met James Connolly and became his personal secretary. Carney became Connolly's friend and confidant as they worked together to improve the conditions for female labourers in Belfast. Carney and Connolly worked together to try a better women's rights and suffrage among the female factory labourers, alongside fellow union organisers such as Ellen Grimley. According to her biographer Helga Woggon, Carney was the person best acquainted with Connolly's politics. Carney then joined Cumann na mBan, the women's auxiliary of the Irish Volunteers, and attended its first meeting in 1914.

Easter Rising

She was present with Connolly in the Dublin General Post Office during the Easter Rising in 1916. Carney was the only woman present during the initial occupation of the building, which she entered armed with a typewriter and a Webley revolver. While not a combatant, she was given the rank of adjutant and was among the final group (including Connolly and Patrick Pearse) to leave the GPO. After Connolly became wounded, she refused to leave his side. This was despite direct orders from Pearse and Connolly. She had earlier taken the wounded Connolly's final dictated orders. Carney, alongside Elizabeth O'Farrell and Julia Grenan left the GPO with the rest of the rebels when the building became engulfed in flames. They made their new headquarters in nearby Moore Street before Pearse surrendered. 

After her capture, she was held in Kilmainham Gaol and was then moved to Mountjoy Prison. Carney, alongside Helena Molony, Maria Perolz, Brigid Foley and Ellen O'Ryan and others were moved to an English prison. 69 women were released from prison one week after the execution of the Rising's leaders. By August 1916 Carney was imprisoned in Aylesbury prison alongside Nell Ryan and Helena Molony. The three requested that their internee status, and the privileges it brought, be revoked so that they would be held as normal prisoners with Countess Markievicz. Their request was denied, however Carney and Molony were released two days before Christmas 1916. After the Anglo-Irish Treaty and the formation of the Irish Free State, Carney sided with the Anti-Treaty forces and was arrested several times. She was interned in Armagh Gaol on 25 July 1922 and released on 9 August 1922.

Because her own time of imprisonment, Carney was not opposed to visiting her political friends during their times in prison. It was recorded that she visited Austin Stack in December 1918.

Political career 
She was one of the first Irish women to be qualified as a secretary and a short hand typist from Hughes' Commercial Academy. She worked as a clerk and became involved in the Gaelic League in the Suffragist movement and in socialist activities. She met James Connolly in 1912 and consequently became the secretary for the Textile Workers' Union. In 1913 she was heavily involved in the fundraising for the locked-out Dublin labourers. As a result of her deep involvement with the trade union, she met and eventually became Connolly's typist, typing his articles for publication. Aside from being his typist, she became a friend and confidant. According to her biographer, Helga Woggon, she had become the person most closely acquainted with Connolly's beliefs, ideals, and plans.

When the Great War commenced in 1914, Carney concurred with Connolly that it was the perfect time to stage a rebellion, even if it was only of a symbolic value.

While she was in Cumann na mBan, she taught first aid and developed a proficiency for handling a rifle. On 14 April 1916, she was summoned by Connolly to join him in the insurgents in the General Post Office where they were garrisoned. Initially, Carney was the only woman at the headquarters of the General Post Office and one of the three remaining women when the garrison had to evacuate the building when it was burned and had to relocate to Moore Street. After Connolly became wounded, she stayed with him. Afterwards, Carney was arrested and held in Kilmainham, Mountjoy, and Aylesbury Jails until the Christmas of 1916.

In the 1917 Belfast Cumann na mBan convention, she was the delegate.

She stood for Parliament as a Sinn Féin candidate for Belfast Victoria in the 1918 general election. She polled 4.05% of the vote, gaining 539 votes. Carney lost to the Labour Unionists. Having lost, she decided instead to continue her work at the Irish Transport and General Workers' Union until 1928. By 1924 she had become a member of the Labour Party. In the 1930s she joined the Belfast Socialist Party.

Following the Civil War, Carney became a lot more disillusioned with politics. She was very critical and outspoken of Éamon de Valera and his governments.

Later life and death

In 1928 she married George McBride, a Protestant Orangeman and former member of the Ulster Volunteers. Ironically, the formation of the Ulster Volunteers prompted the formation of the Irish Volunteers, of which Carney was a member. Carney alienated anyone in her life that did not support her marriage to George McBride. McBride was however a fellow socialist. She continued to be involved in the trade union movement, working for the Irish Transport and General Workers' Union.

A number of serious health problems limited her political activities in the late 1930s. Carney died in Belfast, Northern Ireland on 21 November 1943, and is buried in Milltown Cemetery. Her resting place was found years later and a headstone was erected by the National Graves Association, Belfast. Because Carney married a Protestant and former Orangeman, she was not allowed to have his name (McBride) on her gravestone due to the religious differences. They were married for fifteen years and George McBride never remarried after Carney's early death.

In 2013, the Seventieth Anniversary of Carney's death was remembered by the Socialist Republican Party. Almost one hundred people attended as a short parade followed, marking an commemorating the work Carney did for the cause. She was placed in high esteem among the other hundreds of radical women, who stood up for what they believed in, regardless of the consequences they faced.

References

Further reading

 
  

1887 births
1943 deaths
Irish socialists
People from Bangor, County Down
Sinn Féin parliamentary candidates
People of the Easter Rising
Irish trade unionists
Cumann na mBan members
Irish suffragists
Irish socialist feminists